Kippei Ishida (石田 吉平, born 28 April 2000) is a Japanese rugby sevens player. He competed in the men's tournament at the 2020 Summer Olympics.

References

External links
 

2000 births
Living people
Male rugby sevens players
Olympic rugby sevens players of Japan
Rugby sevens players at the 2020 Summer Olympics
People from Amagasaki
Rugby sevens players at the 2018 Summer Youth Olympics